Torsten Laen (born 26 November 1979) is a Danish team handball player. He currently plays for the Danish club GOG.

Laen has been a part of the Danish national handball team, winning medals in 2002 and 2004

Honours
EHF Champions League: 2
: 2008, 2009
Spanish Championship: 2
: 2008, 2009
Danish Championship: 5
: 2000, 2004, 2007, 2014, 2015
Danish Handball Cup: 4
: 2002, 2003, 2005, 2013

References

External links
EM Sverige 2002 at Danish Handball Federation
EM Slovenien 2005 at Danish Handball Federation

1979 births
Living people
Danish male handball players
Danish expatriate sportspeople in Spain
Danish expatriate sportspeople in Germany
Liga ASOBAL players
BM Ciudad Real players
Sportspeople from Odense